Krupa na Vrbasu is a village by the river Vrbas in the municipality of Banja Luka, Republika Srpska, Bosnia and Herzegovina.

Sport
 FK Krupa - football club.

References

Villages in Republika Srpska
Populated places in Banja Luka